In the Fishtank 15 is a collaborative EP by Sparklehorse and Christian Fennesz. It is the fifteenth and most recent installment of the collaboration project by Konkurrent and the final release by Sparklehorse before the death of leader Mark Linkous in 2010. Fennesz had previously appeared on Sparklehorse's 2006 album Dreamt for Light Years in the Belly of a Mountain, and, following a number of live shows together, both artists felt that there was further mileage in the collaboration. The EP was recorded in two days in December 2007 and released in September 2009.

Track listing

Personnel
Mark Linkous, Christian Fennesz – acoustic guitar, electric guitar, keyboard, composer
Zlaya Hadzic – mixing, producer

References

External links
In the Fishtank on Konkurrent web site.

15
Sparklehorse albums
Fennesz albums
Split EPs
2009 EPs
Konkurrent EPs